Lada (Cyrillic: Лада) is the surname of the following people:
 Androniki Lada (born 1991), Cypriot discus thrower
Anton Lada (1890–1944), American ragtime, jazz and dance musician and recording artist
Elizabeth Lada, American astronomer
Éric Lada (born 1965), French football player
 Josef Lada (1887–1957), Czech illustrator
Oksana Lada (born 1976), Ukrainian actress
Otakar Lada (1883–1956), Bohemian fencer
Polly Lada-Mocarski (1902 – 1997), American bookbinder, inventor and rare book scholar.

See also
Ladas (disambiguation)